Syllitus tabidus is a species of beetle in the family Cerambycidae. It was described by Pascoe in 1871.

References

Stenoderini
Beetles described in 1871